Hisao Ikeda() is a Japanese mixed martial artist. He competed in the Bantamweight and Featherweight division.

Mixed martial arts record

|-
| Loss
| align=center| 10-5-3
| Masato Shiozawa
| TKO (punches)
| Shooto: Year End Show 2002
| 
| align=center| 3
| align=center| 4:14
| Urayasu, Chiba, Japan
| 
|-
| Draw
| align=center| 10-4-3
| Masahiro Oishi
| Draw
| Shooto: Treasure Hunt 10
| 
| align=center| 3
| align=center| 5:00
| Yokohama, Kanagawa, Japan
| 
|-
| Win
| align=center| 10-4-2
| Hiroaki Yoshioka
| Decision (unanimous)
| Shooto: Treasure Hunt 1
| 
| align=center| 3
| align=center| 5:00
| Tokyo, Japan
| 
|-
| Win
| align=center| 9-4-2
| Ichaku Murata
| Decision (unanimous)
| Shooto: Gig East 7
| 
| align=center| 3
| align=center| 5:00
| Tokyo, Japan
| 
|-
| Loss
| align=center| 8-4-2
| Katsuya Toida
| Decision (unanimous)
| Shooto: To The Top 1
| 
| align=center| 3
| align=center| 5:00
| Tokyo, Japan
| 
|-
| Draw
| align=center| 8-3-2
| Joao Roque
| Draw
| VTJ 1999: Vale Tudo Japan 1999
| 
| align=center| 3
| align=center| 8:00
| 
| 
|-
| Loss
| align=center| 8-3-1
| Uchu Tatsumi
| Decision (split)
| Shooto: Renaxis 4
| 
| align=center| 3
| align=center| 5:00
| Tokyo, Japan
| 
|-
| Win
| align=center| 8-2-1
| Colin Mannsur
| TKO (punches)
| Shooto: Las Grandes Viajes 6
| 
| align=center| 2
| align=center| 1:49
| Tokyo, Japan
| 
|-
| Win
| align=center| 7-2-1
| Mamoru Okochi
| Decision (unanimous)
| Shooto: Gig '98 2nd
| 
| align=center| 3
| align=center| 5:00
| Tokyo, Japan
| 
|-
| Win
| align=center| 6-2-1
| Omar Salvosa
| Submission (achilles lock)
| Shooto: Las Grandes Viajes 2
| 
| align=center| 1
| align=center| 4:23
| Tokyo, Japan
| 
|-
| Win
| align=center| 5-2-1
| Jin Akimoto
| Decision (unanimous)
| Shooto: Las Grandes Viajes 1
| 
| align=center| 3
| align=center| 5:00
| Tokyo, Japan
| 
|-
| Win
| align=center| 4-2-1
| Masahiro Oishi
| Decision (unanimous)
| Shooto: Reconquista 3
| 
| align=center| 2
| align=center| 5:00
| Tokyo, Japan
| 
|-
| Loss
| align=center| 3-2-1
| Jin Akimoto
| Decision (majority)
| Shooto: Reconquista 1
| 
| align=center| 3
| align=center| 3:00
| Tokyo, Japan
| 
|-
| Win
| align=center| 3-1-1
| Kenzi Daikanyama
| Decision (majority)
| Shooto: Let's Get Lost
| 
| align=center| 3
| align=center| 3:00
| Tokyo, Japan
| 
|-
| Win
| align=center| 2-1-1
| Katsuhisa Akasaki
| Decision (majority)
| Shooto: Free Fight Kawasaki
| 
| align=center| 3
| align=center| 3:00
| Kawasaki, Kanagawa, Japan
| 
|-
| Loss
| align=center| 1-1-1
| Uchu Tatsumi
| KO (punches)
| Shooto: Vale Tudo Junction 3
| 
| align=center| 1
| align=center| 0:47
| Tokyo, Japan
| 
|-
| Draw
| align=center| 1-0-1
| Masahiro Oishi
| Draw
| Shooto: Vale Tudo Junction 2
| 
| align=center| 3
| align=center| 3:00
| Tokyo, Japan
| 
|-
| Win
| align=center| 1-0
| Yoshiyuki Takayama
| Submission (kimura)
| Shooto: Vale Tudo Junction 1
| 
| align=center| 3
| align=center| 2:57
| Tokyo, Japan
|

See also
List of male mixed martial artists

References

External links
 
 Hisao Ikeda at mixedmartialarts.com
 Hisao Ikeda at fightmatrix.com

Japanese male mixed martial artists
Bantamweight mixed martial artists
Featherweight mixed martial artists
Living people
Year of birth missing (living people)